Asaluyeh County is in Bushehr province, Iran. The capital of the county is the city of Asaluyeh. At the 2006 census, the region's population (as Asaluyeh District of Kangan County) was 54,320 in 6,557 households, The following census in 2011 counted 65,584 people in 10,364 households. At the 2016 census, the county's population was 73,958 in 16,496 households.

Administrative divisions

The population history and structural changes of Asaluyeh County's administrative divisions over three consecutive censuses are shown in the following table. The latest census shows two districts, four rural districts, and two cities.

References

 

Counties of Bushehr Province